Delille or DeLille is a surname. Notable people with the surname include:

Daniel Armand-Delille (1906–1957), French bobsledder who competed in the early 1930s
Henriette DeLille (1813–1862), founded the Catholic order of the Sisters of the Holy Family in New Orleans
Jacques Delille (1738–1813), French poet and translator
Paul Felix Armand-Delille (1874‑1963), physician, bacteriologist, professor, and member of the French Academy of Medicine

De Lille or de Lille is a surname. Notable people with the surname include:
 Patricia de Lille (1951), South African politician and former mayor of Cape Town (2011–2018)

See also
DeLille Cellars, winery near Woodinville, Washington, USA

de:Delille